Don Stannard (10 September 1915 – 9 July 1949) was a British actor.

Born in Westcliff-on-Sea, Essex, Stannard trained at RADA, graduating in 1935. He is best remembered for playing the secret agent Dick Barton in three Hammer films: Dick Barton: Special Agent, Dick Barton Strikes Back and Dick Barton at Bay. A fourth Barton film was scheduled, Dick Barton in Africa, but Stannard was killed in a car crash driving back from the wrap party and Hammer elected not to continue the series.

Filmography

References

External links

1915 births
1949 deaths
British male film actors
People from Westcliff-on-Sea
20th-century British male actors
Alumni of RADA